Die Transvaler was a South African newspaper founded in 1937 with the aim of promoting Afrikaner nationalism and supporting the Transvaal branch of the National Party. Hendrik Verwoerd was its first editor.

History 
On 1 October 1937, Nasionale Pers set up the company Voortrekkerpers in the Transvaal to support the National Party in Transvaal by publishing Die Transvaler. Initially the Cape National Party tried to control the extremism of the National Party in the Transvaal by appointing Hendrik Verwoerd as the papers first editor but he would side with Transvaal branch and Nationale Pers gave up editorial control in 1939.

Editors

 H.F. Verwoerd (1937-1948)
 J.J. Kruger (1948-1960)
 G.D. Sholtz (1960-1968)
 C.F. Nöffke (1969-1973)
 Willem Johannes de Klerk (1973-1987)

References

1937 establishments in South Africa
Afrikaans-language newspapers
Afrikaner culture in Johannesburg